The results of the 1997 United Kingdom general election, by parliamentary constituency were as follows:

Results by parliamentary constituency 

*For Northern Ireland : Alliance Party of Northern Ireland is Liberal Democrats and Northern Ireland Conservatives is Conservative Party

References

See also 

 1997 United Kingdom general election
List of MPs elected in the 1997 United Kingdom general election

1997 United Kingdom general election
1997_United_Kingdom_general_election